Flightline was an airline based in Southend-on-Sea, England. It operated branded wet lease, ad hoc and contract passenger and freight charter services, as well as VIP flights and aircraft sales and maintenance. Sub-services were flown for major airlines in Europe as required. Its main bases' were London Southend Airport.

The company held a United Kingdom Civil Aviation Authority Type A Operating Licence, and was permitted to carry passengers, cargo and mail on aircraft with 20 or more seats.

Flightline operated up to 14 flights a day between Aberdeen (ABZ) and Scatsta in the Shetland Isles (SCS) on behalf of Royal Dutch Shell and other members of the IAC (Integrated Aviation Consortium). Offshore workers were flown to Scatsta Airport and then transferred onto helicopters to several oil platforms, however this contract was due to end in February 2009.

Flightline also had a maintenance facility at its Southend base which provided base maintenance for the BAe-146 fleet as well as a small number of 3rd party aircraft. The engineering facility was closed in July 2008 in order to raise more funds to keep the airline running.

At time of closure of the airline in December 2008, they had contracts to operate several services on behalf of British Airways out of London City Airport, and also for the Ford car company from their base at Southend (near the Ford European headquarters) to Cologne, Germany. The MD-80 fleet operated a range of holiday charter flights to the Mediterranean, Manchester being a common departure point. The MD-80 fleet were grounded at Southend in November 2008 due to the lack of business in the winter season. Upon Flightline's demise the airline had debts exceeding £6 Million.

History 
The airline was established in April 1989 and started operations in 1990. Initially it had two Embraer EMB 110 Bandeirante aircraft (G-OFLT and G-FLTY) which operated mail and small parcel flights from Southend.
It began jet operations in March 1992 operating on behalf of independent tour operator Palmair from Bournemouth until 1999.
In November 2001 it took over the contract (previously operated by British World Airlines) between Aberdeen and Scatsta, transporting oil rig workers.

In August 2007, a Flightline plane operating from Lisbon, Portugal to Dublin, Ireland had to make an emergency go-around after the pilot mistook the lights of a local hotel for the runway and proceeded on approach towards it. The aircraft only diverted from its approach towards the 16 story hotel after being alerted to his mistake by Air Traffic Control.

The company was placed into administration on 3 December 2008.

Destinations

Africa
Egypt
Marsa Alam – Marsa Alam International Airport
Sharm el-Sheikh – Sharm el-Sheikh International Airport

Europe
France
Paris – Charles de Gaulle Airport
Germany
Cologne/Bonn – Cologne Bonn Airport
Italy
Milan – Malpensa International Airport
Venice – Venice Marco Polo Airport
Ireland
Dublin – Dublin Airport
Netherlands
Rotterdam – Rotterdam Airport
Spain
Gran Canaria – Gran Canaria Airport
Lanzarote – Lanzarote Airport
Tenerife – Tenerife South Airport
Switzerland
Zürich – Zürich Airport
United Kingdom
England
Birmingham – Birmingham Airport
London – London City Airport
Southend-on-Sea – London Southend Airport Base
Scotland
Aberdeen – Aberdeen Airport
Edinburgh – Edinburgh Airport
Lerwick – Scatsta Airport

Accidents and Incidents 
on 10 October 2001, a Flightline Swearingen Merlin IV crashes off Meditterian Sea killing 10. Investigation revealed, possible a lightning stroke to plane caused losing electricity and broke up in the air.

Fleet 
The Flightline fleet consisted of the following aircraft (at July 2008):

See also
 List of defunct airlines of the United Kingdom

References

External links

Defunct airlines of the United Kingdom
Airlines established in 1989
Airlines disestablished in 2008